Ficus schumacheri is a species of tree in the family Moraceae. The species is monoecious.

It is found in countries like Brazil, Guyana, Suriname, Trinidad-Tobago, Peru, and Venezuela. It is also found in French Guiana.

References

schumacheri
Least concern plants
Taxonomy articles created by Polbot